This is a disambiguation page for the term St. Hilda's. For the root word see: Hilda (disambiguation) 
St Hilda's may refer to:

Religion
 Hilda of Whitby is a Christian saint known as St. Hilda
 St. Hilda's Church (disambiguation) is the name of numerous churches.

Places
 St Hilda's, Middlesbrough, now known as Middlehaven, the old part of the town of Middlesbrough

Education
Argentina
 St Hilda's College (Buenos Aires), is a private day school located in Hurlingham, Buenos Aires, Argentina.

Australia
 St Hilda's School, an Anglican day and boarding school for girls from Reception to Year 12, located in the suburb of Southport, Gold Coast Australia.
 St Hilda's Anglican School for Girls, a private day and boarding school located in Mosman Park, Perth, Western Australia
 St Hilda's College (University of Melbourne), a residential college at the University of Melbourne in Australia.

Canada
 St. Hilda's College, Toronto, the women's section of the University of Trinity College, itself a federated College of the University of Toronto in Canada.
Jamaica 
St Hilda's Diocesan High School, located in Browns Town St Ann.
New Zealand
 St. Hilda's Collegiate School, in Dunedin

Singapore
 Saint Hilda's Primary School, a primary school in Tampines, Singapore.
 Saint Hilda's Secondary School, a secondary school also found in Tampines, Singapore.

United Kingdom
 St Hilda's Church of England High School
 St Hilda's College, Oxford, one of the constituent colleges of the University of Oxford in the United Kingdom.

United States
 St. Hilda's & St. Hugh's, an independent Episcopal elementary school in New York City.